Damon Murphy (born 15 December 1984) is an Australian professional rugby union referee and a former national captain for Australia in rugby sevens. His usual position was on the wing.

Family and early life
Damon Murphy was born in Brisbane and educated at Nudgee College. His younger brother Dallan Murphy also became a professional rugby union player.

Rugby career
Murphy played club rugby for Brothers Old Boys, where, playing mainly at fullback, he was the club's all-time leading try scorer with 96 tries during his career there spanning eleven seasons. He was selected for the Australian 7s team in 2004. After three seasons, including representing his country at the 2006 Commonwealth Games in Melbourne, he refocused on fifteen-a-side rugby and signed with the Melbourne Rebels to play in the Australian Rugby Championship.

Resuming his career with the national sevens team, Murphy was Australia's leading points scorer in the 2007–08 World Series. He played in the 2009 Rugby World Cup Sevens. He also captained the side.

Murphy played for the Queensland Reds in 2012, although was not selected for Super Rugby.

Refereeing career
Murphy made a rapid rise up the refereeing ranks in 2016, making his debut with the whistle in both Queensland Premier Rugby and Australia's National Rugby Championship in that year. He joined the World Rugby Sevens Series referees panel for the 2016–17 season.

References

External links 
 

1984 births
Australian rugby union referees
ARU referees
Australian rugby union players
Australia international rugby sevens players
Commonwealth Games rugby sevens players of Australia
Living people
People from Brisbane
Rugby sevens players at the 2006 Commonwealth Games
Super Rugby referees